Maharram Əli oğlu Mammadyarov (17 October 1924 – 2 January 2022) was an Azerbaijani scientist, doctor of chemistry, real member of Azerbaijan National Academy of Sciences.

Biography
Maharram Mammadyarov was born in Yayji, Julfa, Nakhichivan ASSR. In 1941, he graduated from Nakhchivan Pedagogical Technical School. He participated in WWII, serving in the Army. Mammadyarov graduated from Azerbaijan State University in 1949, and in 1953 from Leningrad Technical University by obtaining PhD. During 1953–1955, he worked as scientific secretary at Institute of Chemistry of Azerbaijan of National Academy of Sciences of Azerbaijan Soviet Socialist Republic. In 1955–1959 he was Senior Research Fellow at the Institute of Organic Chemistry named after N. Zelinski of the USSR Academy of Sciences. In 1959–1969 Mammadyarov worked at the Institute of Petrochemical Processes named after Y.H. Mammadaliyev. In 1973–1979 he was the head of Nakhchivan regional scientific center of ANAS. For his work on the use of carbon dioxide in the industry, he was awarded the State Prize of the Republic of Azerbaijan. In 1975–1978 Mammadyarov worked as teacher at the Nakhchivan State Pedagogical Institute (present Nakhchivan State University). From 1981 to 1994 he worked as the head of the department, and from 1994 to 2002 he worked as director of the Microbiology Institute of ANAS. Since 1969 he had been working at the Institute of Petrochemical Processes named after Y.H. Mammadaliyev as the Head of Synthesis and Technology of Synthetic Fats laboratory until his death in 2022.

Mammadyarov died on 2 January 2022, at the age of 97. He was the father of Minister of Foreign Affairs of Azerbaijan, Elmar Mammadyarov.

Awards
1st degree order of the Great Patriotic War
State Prize of the Republic of Azerbaijan (1980)
Y. Mammadaliyev medal (1995)
Shohrat Order (2005)
 "OGS" golden medal and diploma (2006)
Honorary title of Honored Scientist (2009)
Y. Mammadaliyev prize (2014)
Sharaf Order (2014)

References

1924 births
2022 deaths
Soviet academics
Academic staff of Nakhchivan State University
Azerbaijani chemists
Soviet chemists
20th-century chemists
Organic chemists
People from the Nakhchivan Autonomous Republic
Soviet military personnel of World War II